The Biu Emirate is a traditional state based in Biu in Borno State, Nigeria. Prior to 1920 it was referred to as the Biu Kingdom.

History
The rulers of Biu are numbered from Abdullahi, later known as Yamta-ra-Wala or Yamta the Great, who established his rule about 1535. Around 1670, in the reign of Mari Watila Tampta, it became known as a kingdom. 
The main ethnic group is the Babur/Bura people, related to the Kanuri people.
The founder was said to have come from elsewhere, captured the main town in the area, then founded a new capital in Dlimbur, which is now an archaeological site. His descendants formed two rival dynasties, one at Kogu and the other in nearby Mandaragirau.

King Mari Watirwa (r. 1793–1838) of Kogu defeated Fulani invaders from the Gombe Emirate to the west. In 1878 Mari Biya, became the first Bura king to rule from Biu. The emir's palace is now situated in the town.
With British rule, Biu division was created in 1918. Mai Ari Dogo was acknowledged as the first emir of Biu in 1920. The area became known as the Biu federation after 1957, when the districts of Shani and Askira were added to the emirate.

The Biu Emirate includes the Biu, Hawul, Kwaya Kusar and Bayo local government areas.
The Biu Emirate has by convention always produced the Deputy Governor of Borno State, representing the south of the state.
Until recently, the Biu Emirate was one of three in Borno State, the others being the Borno Emirate and the Dikwa Emirate.
In March 2010 the Borno State Governor Ali Modu Sheriff split the old Dikwa Emirate into the new Bama and Dikwa Emirates.
This triggered petitions from the people of Hawul, Kwaya Kusar and Bayo to also have separate chiefdoms, which the governor had stated he would do "if the need arises".

Rulers

Mai Biu, also styled Kuthli, were:

Emirs were:

Local Government Areas in Biu Emirate 
Biu Emirate covers four Local Government Areas:
 Biu
 Bayo
 Hawul
 Kwaya Kusar

References

History of Nigeria
Borno State
Nigerian traditional states
Emirates